Bexar is an unincorporated community in southwest Fulton County, Arkansas, United States. Bexar has a post office with ZIP code 72515.

References

Unincorporated communities in Fulton County, Arkansas
Unincorporated communities in Arkansas